Kuhveriakee Kaakuhey? is a 2011 Maldivian romantic horror film directed by Aishath Ali Manik. Produced by Abdul Hannan Moosa Didi under UR3A Production, the film stars Ahmed Azmeel, Aishath Rishmy and Sheereen Abdul Wahid in pivotal roles. The film was released on 17 May 2011. Upon release, the film received negative response from critics and was declared a flop at box office.

Cast 
 Ahmed Azmeel as Azeen
 Aishath Rishmy as Asha Ali
 Sheereen Abdul Wahid
 Aminath Rasheedha
 Ahmed Shah

Development
The film was written in 2007 by producer Abdul Hannan Moosa Didi's two daughters Hawwa Alishan and Ulvy. Inspired by Ram Gopal Varma's Bollywood horror romantic thriller film Darling (2007), the film revolves around a man who cheats on his wife with his secretary, and how his life slides to a haunting shift when he accidentally kills his mistress. The project was handed over to Abdul Faththaah for the dubbing process, and accusation rose that Fatthah has allegedly "copied" the storyline for his next project 14 Vileyrey which also features Aishath Rishmy.

Soundtrack

Accolades

References

2011 films
2011 horror films
Maldivian horror films
Romantic horror films